Andrea Ridolfi (born 4 August 1963) is an Italian  musician, composer and orchestra director.

Life and career
Ridolfi studied double bass and complementary piano at the Conservatorio Licinio Refice in Frosinone. He achieved the study of musicality and composition. In 1984, he graduated from the "Roberto Rossellini" State Institute for Cinematography and Television in Rome. A multi-instrumentalist (double bass, bass, cello, guitars, piano and drums) and MIDI-programmer, he has worked with composers like Luis Enríquez Bacalov, Egisto Macchi, Carlo Crivelli, Ralph Towner, Stelvio Cipriani and Carlo Crivelli. He has composed soundtracks for cinema, theatre, television and advertising since 1983. Such activity took him, from 1985 to 1997, to collaborate with CAM in Rome. He showed his experience as an arranger and orchestral conductor, personally safeguarding the recording of music.

Two of the most important works of that period are "Totò, the Prince of Satirical Comedy" (1993), and "The Italian Neorealism" (1994). For these, Ridolfi rewrote the entire score for orchestra starting from the vision of the films and then recorded them with the Bulgarian Symphonic Orchestra in Sofia (Bulgaria). As a musical consultant, he has worked on several movie soundtrack compilations with Nino Rota, Luis Enríquez Bacalov, Carlo Rustichelli, Armando Trovajoli, Alessandro Cicognini and Stelvio Cipriani), sharpening his own knowledge of Italian cinematography. In 1994, he started many different projects, the most important being the realisation of the music for the sit-com Domenica in, an Italian Sunday afternoon format on Rai Uno (1998–99). They composed the music for the important Italian fiction series on Rai 3, La squadra (55 episodes, 2005–07).

In 2009, he composed the music for Guido Romanelli – Mission in Budapest, a documentary film on the life of Guido Romanelli directed by Gilberto Martinelli. On 1 December 2009, during the presentation of a documentary film in Hungary, he held a concert for piano, cello and guitar in the Italian Institute of Culture in Budapest. In 2010, he composed the soundtrack for the movie Quando si diventa Grandi, directed by Massimo Bonetti (Azteca Productions).

Filmography

Composer 
 1989 – Alien degli abissi (Movie by Antonio Margheriti, as Anthony M. Dawson)
 1989 – Marco e Laura dieci anni fa (TV movie by Carlo Tuzii)
 1989 – Dio ce ne scampi e liberi (by Sibilla Damiani)
 1996 – B. B. K. di (Short by Alessandro Valori)
 1997 – The Loggerheads (Cartoon by Ralph Christians)
 1998 – Domenica in (Sit-com, 6 episodes)
 1999 – Quattro scatti per l'Europa (Short by Ivan Carlei)
 2005 – La squadra (TV series, 52 episodes for Rai 3 2005–2008)
 2009 – Guido Romanelli - Missione a Budapest (Documentary short by Gilberto Martinelli)
 2010 – Quando si diventa grandi (Movie by Massimo Bonetti)
 2011 – Il generale Della Rovere (TV mini series by Carlo Carlei)
 2012 – Ben e Clara, Le ultime lettere (TV series for RAI EDUCATIONAL Rai Cultura)
 2012 – Il generale dei briganti (TV series by Paolo Poeti)
 2012 – Sándor Márai e Napoli - Il sapore amaro della libertà (Documentary short by Gilberto Martinelli)
 2012 – Nel Segno del Tricolore: Italiani e Ungheresi nel Risorgimento (Documentary short by Gilberto Martinelli)
 2013 – The Outsider - Il Cinema Di Antonio Margheriti (documentary by Edoardo Margheriti)
 2013 – Il disordine del cuore (Movie by Edoardo Margheriti)
 2013 – Un caso di coscienza (TV series, 6 episodes for Rai 1)
 2013 – La farfalle granata (TV movie by Paolo Poeti for RAI 1)
 2014 – Il portone di piombo (Documentary short by Gilberto Martinelli)
 2015 – Gli Ungheresi a La Scala (Documentary short by Gilberto Martinelli)
 2015 – Roma o Morte: La vita del colonnello di Garibaldi (Documentary short by Gilberto Martinelli)
 2015 – La storia di Árpád Weisz (Documentary short by Gilberto Martinelli)
 2016 – Il sindaco pescatore (TV movie by Maurizio Zaccaro for RAI 1)

Other works 
 1991 – La condanna (sound mixer and sound recordist) (Movie by Marco Bellocchio)
 1995 – Lumière et compagnie (arranger "Ginger et Fred" as André Ridolfi) (Documentary)

External links
 

Italian musicians
Living people
1963 births